Apaitia Seru is a Fijian lawyer and former politician and judge, who served briefly as Attorney General of Fiji in 1992. He was also a member of the House of Representatives from 1992 to 1994. He held the Kadavu Fijian Communal Constituency for the Soqosoqo ni Vakavulewa ni Taukei

In April 2006, the Fiji Law Society fined him US$6000 for improper handling of a client's trust fund.

Prior to serving as Attorney General, Seru had been a magistrate, and for a time, Chief Magistrate.

Personal life 
Seru is a devout Christian and a member of the Full Gospel Business Men's Fellowship International.

References

Politicians from Kadavu Province
Soqosoqo ni Vakavulewa ni Taukei politicians
I-Taukei Fijian members of the House of Representatives (Fiji)
20th-century Fijian judges
21st-century Fijian lawyers
Attorneys-general of Fiji
Fijian Christians
Living people
Year of birth missing (living people)
Place of birth missing (living people)